Baokang County is a county of northwestern Hubei province, People's Republic of China. It is under the administration of Xiangyang City.

Administrative divisions
Ten towns:
Chengguan, Huang, Houping, Longping, Dianya, Maliang, Xiema, Maqiao, Siping, Guoduwan

The only township is Liangyu Township

Climate

Regional Specialty

Crepe Myrtle 
Native in the mountains, 
Crepe Myrtle is named as the official flower for the county. Crepe Myrtle in Baokang is known for its varieties and long history. Baokang county has six species of Crepe Myrtle. Some are more than 1000 years old.

Hotsprings

Mineral Resources 
Baokang County has great volume of mineral resources. Twenty four types of mineral resources have been discovered in its area, twelve of which the potential volume of them were determined. Metal mineral resources in this area include iron, manganese, vanadium, copper, lead and zinc, multi-metal, and alumina. Non-metal mineral resources include phosphorus, coal, sulfur, calcite, rock crystal, barite, and fluorite.

Wood Ear 
Wood ear, sometimes also called Jews ear, is a type of fungus that grow on logs and wet ground. Baokang county is known for its high quality product of both black wood ear and white wood ear.

Wild Calyx Canthus 
Wild Flower Valley Natural Scenic Area is located north of Baokang County,  from the county seat, is the first bloom of a wild nature reserve's core area, is also found in the Old World the only place where a large bloom life. Baokang bloom is the first in the 4th century legacy of the ancient glaciers of wild plant communities, as can be a huge title of "biological gene pool." 
Valley is a wild stretch of 20 kilometers of the valley, the growth of more than 20 million trees over 800 hectares of Port Hope, yellow, red, purple core, sandalwood and other rare species of bloom, most of them have more than a century old, each to the end of the year, confrontation between the competing wild plum folder put, from afar, from top to bottom overlap, according to Yin Yingyang, fluffy snow, like the swirling clouds. 
The world's rare species of wild peony, Rhododendron, Taxus, and other rare plants throughout the valley, cherish the nobile, Paris polyphylla, and a hundred species of rare medicinal plants.

External links

Counties of Hubei
Xiangyang